Pomponio State Beach is a state beach of California in the United States.

This coastal strip lies between Pescadero and San Gregorio State Beaches. It is made up of several miles of sloping, sandy beaches and a small lagoon below high sandstone bluffs.

A parking lot and a picnic area are available for public use during the day. There are hiking trails and beach access. No camping is available. Dogs and campfires are not permitted on the beach.

The beach was named after José Pomponio Lupugeym, a Bolinas Native American and outlaw.  He was a captain of a group that called itself Los Insurgentes, and was captured and executed in 1824.

See also
List of beaches in California
List of California state parks

References

External links
Pomponio State Beach. beachcalifornia.com

California State Beaches
Parks in San Mateo County, California
San Francisco Bay Area beaches
Beaches of San Mateo County, California
Beaches of Northern California